Bernard Mainwaring (1897-1963) was a British film director.

Selected filmography
 The Crimson Candle (1934)
 Whispering Tongues (1934)
 Line Engaged (1935)
 Old Roses (1935)
 The Public Life of Henry the Ninth (1935)
 Show Flat (1936)
 Cross My Heart (1937)
 Jennifer Hale (1937)
 Member of the Jury (1937)
 The Villiers Diamond (1938)

References

External links

1897 births
1963 deaths
British film directors